Melanne Pennington (July 3, 1960 - June 30, 1988) was a former Miss West Virginia  competition winner and a delegate to the 1984 Miss America pageant.

Early life and education 
Born Melanne Lisa Pennington in Kanawha County, West Virginia, she was the oldest daughter of Mel and Sharon Pennington. Her younger sister, Melori Pennington, was three years her Junior. She attended Nitro High School in Nitro, West Virginia, and while there became a member of the National Honor Society. She served as a majorette for two years and Head majorette her senior year with the award winning NHS marching band. Melanne represented NHS at the National Future Business Leaders of America convention in Denver, Colorado.

College 
After highschool, Pennington matriculated to West Virginia University where she earned a Bachelor of Science degree in Elementary Education, and received a Master of Arts degree from West Virginia University's College of Graduate Studies. She was a member of the Alpha Xi chapter of the Delta Gamma (ΔΓ) Sorority. While in college she was selected to dance with the University's dance troupe "Orchesis". She also took voice lessons and trained as a coloratura soprano.

Life as Miss West Virginia 
A beautiful woman and talented singer and dancer, Pennington earned the title "Miss West Virginia" in 1984, and represented West Virginia in the Miss America Pageant in Atlantic City.

Death 
In her late 20s, Pennington was diagnosed with chronic myelogenous leukemia, a form of leukemia characterized by the increased and unregulated growth of predominantly myeloid cells in the bone marrow and the accumulation of these cells in the blood.

She died of the disease on June 30, 1988, at the Chandler Medical Center in Lexington, Kentucky, at age 27. She was buried on her 28th birthday at Cunningham Memorial Park in St. Albans, West Virginia. The Miss West Virginia Scholarship Pageant established an annual award  "The Melanne Pennington Quality of Life Award" in her memory.  She was appointed a "Distinguished West Virginian" by Governor Arch A. Moore, Jr. posthumously in 1988.

Sources 
https://web.archive.org/web/20090922160251/http://www.misswestvirginia.org/
http://www.misswestvirginiausa.com/
http://www.deltagamma.org/

1960 births
1988 deaths
Deaths from leukemia
Miss America 1980s delegates
Nitro High School alumni
People from Nitro, West Virginia
West Virginia University alumni
Beauty pageant contestants from West Virginia